Joseph Craig (born 14 May 1954) is a Scottish former footballer, who played for Sauchie, Partick Thistle, Celtic, Blackburn Rovers, Hamilton Academical and the Scotland national team.

Craig, a striker, joined Partick Thistle in 1972 from Sauchie Juniors. After an impressive start, scoring seven goals in his first twenty games, he attracted the attention of Liverpool FC's Bill Shankly who watched him in Scottish Cup action against Dumbarton on 28 February 1973 but didn't follow it up with a bid.

He helped the club to the First Division title in season 1975-76. He signed for Celtic in September 1976 for £60,000 where he won the Scottish Cup and League Championship in his first season. He moved to Blackburn Rovers in September 1978 where he remained until 1981 when he joined Hamilton Academical. He retired in 1983.

Whilst at Celtic, he earned his only international cap against Sweden in April 1977. He started the match as a substitute and came on after 75 minutes and famously scored before having even kicked the ball, scoring a header just two minutes after replacing Kenny Burns.

After his playing career, he managed Cowdenbeath for three years and later had coaching spells at Armadale Thistle and Airdrieonians. His son Steven is also a professional footballer.

References

External links
 
 

1954 births
Living people
Scottish footballers
Scotland international footballers
Partick Thistle F.C. players
Celtic F.C. players
Blackburn Rovers F.C. players
Hamilton Academical F.C. players
Scottish Football League players
English Football League players
Scottish football managers
Cowdenbeath F.C. managers
Scottish Football League representative players
Association football forwards
Scotland under-23 international footballers
Scottish Football League managers
Sauchie F.C. players
Armadale Thistle F.C. non-playing staff